The Easter Sunday Massacre occurred on Easter Sunday, March 30, 1975, when 41 year-old James U. Ruppert fatally shot eleven members of his own family in his mother's house at 635 Minor Avenue in Hamilton, Ohio.

Ruppert was tried and found guilty on two counts of aggravated murder, but not guilty on the other nine counts by reason of insanity. He received two life sentences, to be served consecutively at Allen Correctional Institution in Lima, Ohio, and the Southern Ohio Correctional Facility in Lucasville, Ohio. On July 25, 1982, a 3-judge panel found Ruppert guilty of aggravated murder on a separate case involving his mother and brother. But shortly afterward, he was found not guilty on other 9 counts of murder by reason of insanity. He was moved to Franklin Medical Center in Columbus, OH in 2019 because of his declining health.

James Ruppert died from natural causes on June 4, 2022 while incarcerated at the Franklin Medical Center in Columbus, Ohio. Ruppert was 88 at the time of his death.

It is the deadliest shooting by a lone perpetrator in the state of Ohio.

Background 

James Urban Ruppert (March 29, 1934 – June 4, 2022) was reported to have had a troubled life. His mother, Charity, had told him that she would have preferred to have a daughter as her second child; his father, Leonard, also had a violent temper and held little affection for his two sons. Leonard died in 1947 when James and his brother Leonard Jr. were aged 12 and 14 respectively.

Leonard Jr. became the father figure of the family and constantly picked on James during their upbringing, often taunting him for being a weakling. At 16, James was so dissatisfied with his home life that he ran away and attempted to commit suicide by hanging himself with a sheet. He was unsuccessful and returned home.

As an adult, Ruppert stood 5'6" and weighed 135 pounds. He was described as a modest, bookish, and helpful man who was unremarkable and quiet. In addition, he had no police record.

By 1975, Ruppert was envious of his older brother's successful job and family. Ruppert himself had dropped out of college after two years, then trained as a draftsman, although by 1975, he was unemployed, was unmarried, and was still living at home with his mother. In contrast, his older brother, Leonard Jr., had earned a degree in electrical engineering, had married one of the few girlfriends James had ever had, owned his own home in the city of Fairfield, and had eight children. Charity was frustrated with James' inability to hold a steady job and his constant drinking; she had threatened to evict him from her home on more than one occasion. James also owed his mother and brother money, having lost much of what little cash he had in the 1973–1974 stock market crash.

Events before the massacre 
A month before the massacre, James inquired about silencers for his weapons while purchasing ammunition. His behavior deteriorated caused by a deep depression as he neared the breaking point. On March 29, 1975 (his 41st birthday), witnesses had seen him engaging in target practice shooting tin cans with his .22 pistol and .22 rifle along the banks of the Great Miami River in Hamilton.

The night before the murders, James went out as he did nearly every night. At the 19th Hole Cocktail Lounge he talked with an employee, 28-year-old Wanda Bishop. She would later state that James told her he was frustrated with his mother's demands on him and his impending eviction and that “he needed to solve the problem”. According to Bishop, Ruppert stated that his mother had complained that if he could afford to buy beer seven nights a week, he could afford to pay the rent. Ruppert left the bar at 11:00 p.m. that night and later returned. When Bishop asked him if he had solved the problem, he replied, "No, not yet." James stayed at the bar until it closed at 2:30 a.m.

Massacre 
On Easter Sunday, March 30, 1975, Ruppert's brother Leonard Jr. and his wife, Alma, brought their eight children ranging in age from 4 to 17 for Easter dinner at their house located at 635 Minor Avenue. Ruppert stayed upstairs, sleeping off a night of drinking, while the other family members participated in an Easter egg hunt on the front lawn.

At around 4:00 p.m., James woke up, loaded a .357 Magnum, two .22 caliber handguns, and a rifle, then went downstairs. Charity was preparing sloppy joes in the kitchen, in the company of Leonard Jr. and Alma. Most of the children were playing in the living room.

He killed Leonard Jr. when he shot him in the head in the kitchen, then his sister-in-law Alma when he shot her. Then, as his mother lunged at him, he shot her once in the head and twice in the chest. David, 11, Teresa, 9, and Carol, 13, were later killed by him. 

James turned the corner into the living room. One by one, James shot his remaining niece and nephews: Ann, 12, Leonard III, 17, Michael, 16, Thomas, 15, and John, 4. Charity had been shot once in the chest; the remaining victims were shot in the head and shot again, to ensure they had died. The only sign of a struggle at the crime scene was one overturned wastepaper bin.

The Butler County coroner theorized that Ruppert had likely shot some victims more than once to prevent anyone escaping. The massacre was over in less than two minutes.

After spending three hours in the house, James finally called police and said, "There's been a shooting." He waited just inside the front door for authorities to arrive.

Victims 
Charity Ruppert, 65, mother
Leonard Ruppert Jr., 42, brother
Alma Ruppert, 38, sister-in-law
Leonard Ruppert III, 17, nephew
Michael Ruppert, 16, nephew
Thomas Ruppert, 15, nephew
Carol Ruppert, 13, niece
Ann Ruppert, 12, niece
David Ruppert, 11, nephew
Teresa Ruppert, 9, niece
John Ruppert, 4, nephew

Aftermath 
The murders shocked the town of Hamilton. Those who knew James did not think he was capable of violence, especially at the magnitude of this particular massacre. By all accounts, neighbors considered the Rupperts a nice family.

James was arrested and charged that day with 11 counts of aggravated homicide. He refused to answer questions asked by the police and was very uncooperative. He made it clear he would plead insanity.

County prosecutor John Holcomb viewed the crime scene and stated that there was so much blood on the first floor, it was dripping through the floorboards into the basement. Ruppert had fired a total of 35 rounds, and all four weapons were recovered at the scene.

All 11 victims were buried in Arlington Memorial Gardens in Cincinnati, Ohio. A year later, the house was opened to the public and all of its contents were auctioned off. It was then cleaned, recarpeted, and rented to a family new to the area, whose members were unaware of the murders that had taken place there. The new family later left the house, claiming they were hearing voices and other unexplained noises. Other families have moved in and out, and the house is still occupied.

Criminal proceedings 
The original trial was held in Hamilton, Ohio in June 1975. The three-judge panel found Ruppert guilty on 11 counts of murder and sentenced him to life in prison on July 3. A mistrial was declared because the three judge panel did not know if the ruling had to be unanimous or majority rule. It was decided that the retrial would be held in Findlay, Ohio, 125 miles north, because it was believed he could not receive a fair trial in the city of Hamilton.

The second trial began in July 23, 1975 and prosecutors revealed evidence involving the witnesses who had seen Ruppert engaging in target practice, asking about silencers for his gun collection and admitting that his mother's expectations were a problem that he needed to solve. In July 1975, Ruppert received 11 consecutive life sentences.

On appeal, a new trial was granted in 1982. Defense attorney Hugh D. Holbrock, convinced his client was insane, personally funded the hiring of expert psychiatrists and psychologists from all over the country.

On July 23, 1982, another three-judge panel found Ruppert guilty on two counts first degree murder (his mother and brother), but found him not guilty on the other nine counts of murder, by reason of insanity. He received one life sentence for each count, to be served consecutively.

Because capital punishment had been suspended in the United States from 1972 to 1976 as a result of the Supreme Court's decision in Furman v. Georgia; the mass murders on Minor Avenue had occurred in 1975 and Ruppert could not receive the death penalty for his crimes.

On July 30, 1982, at the age of 48, Ruppert was incarcerated with the Ohio Department of Rehabilitation and Correction (ODRC), at the Franklin Medical Center in Columbus, Ohio. His assigned inmate number was A169321.

On June 1995, at the age of 61, Ruppert was granted a hearing before the state Parole Board, but his release was denied. He received subsequent parole board hearings in 2005 (age 71) and April 2015 (age 81) all of which he was denied release.

In 2015 the Allen Oakwood Correctional Institution parole board released a statement: "The board has determined that the inmate is not suitable for release at this time. The inmate has not completed any recommended programming and does not appear to be willing to do so. The inmate’s record notes negative institutional conduct. The inmate took the lives of multiple victims. There has been strong community objections to his release … the release of this inmate would not be in the best interest of justice."

Ruppert's next parole consideration hearing was set to occur April 2025 when he would have been 91.

On June 4, 2022 at the age of 88, Ruppert died from natural causes while incarcerated at the Franklin Medical Center in Columbus, Ohio, a unit of the Ohio Department of Rehabilitation and Correction.

References

External links 
Ruppert house
Strange USA
Vanderbilt Television News Archive
NY Times Mass Slayings article
Google Books The Encyclopedia of Mass Murder

1934 births
2022 deaths
1975 murders in the United States
American mass murderers
American murderers of children
American people convicted of murder
Place of birth missing (living people)
Crimes in Ohio
Familicides
Mass murder in 1975
Murder in Ohio
People convicted of murder by Ohio
Prisoners sentenced to life imprisonment by Ohio
1975 mass shootings in the United States
Mass shootings in Ohio
Mass shootings in the United States